Agnes Lee ( Martha Agnes Rand; 1862–1939) was an American poet and translator.

Biography 
Lee was born Martha Agnes Rand in Chicago on March 6, 1862. She was the second daughter of William H. Rand, an American printer and publisher who co-founded the Rand McNally Company. She was educated at a boarding school in Vevey, Switzerland.

Lee wrote a collection of children's verse in 1898 titled The Round Rabbit. Her debut poetry collection, The Legend of a Thought, was published in 1889. She wrote books of poetry including The Border of the Lake in 1910, The Sharing in 1914, Faces and Open Doors in 1922, and New Lyrics and a Few Old Ones in 1931. She translated Théophile Gautier's Enamels and Cameos and Other Poems in 1903. In 1926, Lee received the guarantor's prize from Poetry Magazine.

In 1890 she married Francis Watts Lee, a photographer, and moved to Boston. They had a daughter. In 1911 she married Otto Freer, a surgeon. Her second husband died in 1932.

Lee died from pneumonia on July 23, 1939 at her home, 81 East Elm Street, in Chicago. She was buried at Graceland Cemetery. A collection of letters exchanged between her and poet Edgar Lee Masters is archived in the Newberry Library in Chicago.

Notes

References 

1868 births
1939 deaths
19th-century American poets
19th-century American translators
20th-century American poets
20th-century American translators
American women poets
Burials at Graceland Cemetery (Chicago)
Writers from Chicago
20th-century American women
Deaths from pneumonia in Illinois